The Fulton County Railway  began operations in 2004, operating on about 25 miles of track owned by CSX Transportation in Georgia. It is owned by OmniTRAX.

External links

References

Georgia (U.S. state) railroads
OmniTRAX
Spin-offs of CSX Transportation